The Itupararanga Dam is a dam, located on the Sorocaba River in the Sorocaba region of São Paulo state. It was built by Light S.A. from 1913 to 1914. The plant started its operation on 25 March 1914.

It was built over the Sorocaba River canyon in the São Francisco Ridge. The water reservoir supplies Ibiúna 100%, Sorocaba 74%, Votorantim 92% and São Roque 32% and other neighboring cities. It is used to irrigate hundreds of farms in the vicinity. It is a leading tourist attraction in the region.

References

External links

Dams completed in 1914
Energy infrastructure completed in 1914
Dams in São Paulo (state)
Hydroelectric power stations in Brazil